Elections to Amber Valley Borough Council in Derbyshire, England took place on Thursday 5 May 2016. One third of the council seats were up for election and after the election the Conservative Party continued to hold overall control of the council.

After the election, the composition of the council was:
 Conservative 23
 Labour 22

Election result

Ward results
Percentage change in party votes are from the last time the ward was contested. This is either 2014 or 2015.

References

2016 English local elections
2016
2010s in Derbyshire